Amélie Dionne is a Canadian politician, who was elected to the National Assembly of Quebec in the 2022 Quebec general election. She represents the riding of Rivière-du-Loup–Témiscouata as a member of the Coalition Avenir Québec.

References

21st-century Canadian politicians
21st-century Canadian women politicians
Coalition Avenir Québec MNAs
Women MNAs in Quebec
French Quebecers
Living people
Year of birth missing (living people)